Tilstone Fearnall is a village and former civil parish, now in the parishes of Tiverton and Tilstone Fearnall and Rushton, in the Cheshire West and Chester district and ceremonial county of Cheshire in England. In 2001 it had a population of 99, increasing to 150 at the 2011 census. The civil parish was abolished in 2015 to form Tiverton and Tilstone Fearnall, part also went to Rushton.

Nearby is the Grade II listed Tilstone Lodge, built between 1821 and 1825 by Thomas Harrison for Admiral John Tollemache (who changed his name from Halliday), the father of John Tollemache, 1st Baron Tollemache of Peckforton Castle.

See also

Listed buildings in Tilstone Fearnall
St Jude's Church, Tilstone Fearnall

References

External links

Villages in Cheshire
Former civil parishes in Cheshire
Cheshire West and Chester